Nelson Kiyoshi Doi (January 1, 1922 – May 16, 2015), was the sixth lieutenant governor of Hawaii from 1974 to 1978 in the first elected administration of Governor George Ariyoshi.  Doi was a member of the Hawaii Democratic Party.

Early and legislative years
Doi attended the University of Hawaii, where he was president of the Associated Students of the University of Hawaii from December 1944 to June 1945.

Doi began his political career at the 1950 Hawaii State Constitutional Convention that drafted the first state laws for Hawaii that went into effect in 1959.  During that Convention, Doi noted "a frustration that began to ferment" amongst the delegates. In the 1954 election, that frustration led to a huge victory for the Democrats, who seized control of what had been a territory dominated by Republicans. Doi, representing Hawaii Island, was one of the victorious Democrats. Other Democrats first elected in 1954 included the late U.S. Senator Dan Inouye, former Governor George Ariyoshi, the late U.S. Senator Spark Matsunaga.

After that victory in 1954, Doi then served in the Hawaii Territorial Senate in 1955–1959 and then in the Hawaii State Senate from 1959 to 1969. During his tenure in the Senate, Doi was frequently at odds with Governor John A. Burns and Senate Democratic leaders.

In 1968, Doi was one of 82 delegates to the Hawaii Constitutional Convention held at McKinley High School. Among the issues addressed at the Convention were reapportioning legislative districts, mandating an annual 60-day legislative session, lengthening the terms of judges, authorizing collective bargaining for public employees, strengthening privacy rights for individuals, enhancing county home rule, and creating the Office of Hawaiian Affairs. Other prominent political figures who were among the delegates were George Ariyoshi, Frank Fasi, and Patricia Saiki.

Judiciary and Lieutenant Governor
In 1970, Doi left the Hawaii State Legislature, after being appointed to the Hawaii State Judiciary as a circuit court judge where he served for five years. Also in 1970, Doi entered the race for Lieutenant Governor of Hawaii, at first aligning himself with fellow Democrat and gubernatorial candidate Thomas Gill. After disagreements with Gill on commitments on political appointments, Doi decided to run independently. Ultimately, both Gill and Doi were defeated by John A. Burns and George Ariyoshi, respectively.

In 1974, Doi was chosen as the running mate for George Ariyoshi. Fourteen months earlier, Ariyoshi, the previous Lieutenant Governor, became Acting Governor upon the incapacitating illness of longtime Governor John A. Burns. Ariyoshi and Doi emerged victorious, becoming the first-ever Japanese Americans to hold simultaneously the Governor and Lieutenant Governor posts of any state in the U.S. Doi was the second Japanese American to hold the position of state Lieutenant Governor.

Later years
After his service as Lieutenant Governor, Doi ran for Mayor of Honolulu and was defeated by Frank Fasi. Doi also ran in the 1977 Honolulu Marathon, finishing in 4 hours, 30 minutes, and "besting his wife by just one minute". In 1977, he also was appointed to then-territorial High Court of the Marshall Islands. Doi was appointed as Chief Justice of the court in 1985. Upon his retirement from that court, Doi taught at various schools in Japan. Doi returned to Waimea on the Big Island of Hawaii where he helped build the North Hawaii Community Hospital.

See also
 List of Asian American jurists
 List of minority governors and lieutenant governors in the United States

References

 Ariyoshi, George R. With Obligation to All.  University of Hawaii Press, 1997.
 Chapin, Helen G. Shaping History : The Role of Newspapers in Hawai'i. Honolulu, HI, USA: University of Hawaii Press, 1996. p 309.
 "Former Lt. Gov. Doi still talking about politics in his retirement." Honolulu Star-Bulletin.  18 Oct 2003.  http://starbulletin.com/2003/10/18/news/whatever.html
 Van Dyke, Jon M..  "Time for a tune-up."  Honolulu Advertiser.  18 May 2008.  http://www.honoluluadvertiser.com/apps/pbcs.dll/article?AID=/20080518/OPINION03/805180336/1110/OPINIONFRONT

1922 births
2015 deaths
University of Hawaiʻi at Mānoa alumni
American jurists of Japanese descent
American politicians of Japanese descent
American judges on the courts of the Marshall Islands
Hawaii state court judges
Lieutenant Governors of Hawaii
Democratic Party Hawaii state senators
Members of the Hawaii Territorial Legislature
20th-century American politicians
Hawaii politicians of Japanese descent
20th-century American judges